The Émeraude-class submarines were a quartet of four minelaying submarines that were ordered for the French Navy during the 1930s. Only the name boat was laid down before the German invasion of France on 10 May 1940 and she was demolished before she could be launched.

Ships

Notes

Bibliography

External links
French Submarines: 1863 - Now
Sous-marins Français 1863 -  (French)

Submarine classes